André Francisco Bruno Ferreira (born 15 June 1990 in Santarém) is a Portuguese former professional footballer who played as a right winger.

References

External links

1990 births
Living people
People from Santarém, Portugal
Portuguese footballers
Association football wingers
Primeira Liga players
Liga Portugal 2 players
Segunda Divisão players
C.S. Marítimo players
Portimonense S.C. players
Leixões S.C. players
Football League (Greece) players
Portuguese expatriate footballers
Expatriate footballers in Greece
Portuguese expatriate sportspeople in Greece
Sportspeople from Santarém District